The following is the discography of LAB Records, an independent record label in Britain founded in 2007.

Releases are in the pop and rock genres, with bands primarily from the United States and UK. As of 2013 the label has released albums such as The Way I Fell In by The Morning Of, Would It Kill You? by Hellogoodbye, and It Hates You by He Is Legend.

Discography

References

External links
 LAB Records

LAB Records